Werkheiser is a surname. Notable people with the surname include:

Bill Werkheiser (born 1960), American politician
Devon Werkheiser (born 1991), American actor, voice actor, singer-songwriter, and musician

English-language surnames